The Dixi was the first car made by BMW.

Dixi was the brand name of cars made by Automobilwerk Eisenach (Eisenach car factory) starting in 1904. In the difficult economic climate of the 1920s the company found it hard to sell its 6/24 and 9/40 models. So the manufacturer decided to enter the small car market, and in 1927 signed a licensing agreement with the Austin Motor Company to build a variant of the Austin 7. A production level of 2000 cars a year was agreed upon, and Dixi paid Austin a royalty on each vehicle produced.

The first 100 cars were supplied by Austin as kits, but by December 1927 the first of the official Dixi-manufactured vehicles, the DA-1 3/15PS were coming off the production line. The DA designation stood for Deutsche Ausführung, meaning German Version; 3/15 indicated the taxation and actual horsepower ratings. Apart from being left-hand drive and using metric fasteners, the car was nearly identical to the Austin. Body styles available were coupé, roadster, tourer, and sedan with a few chassis going to external coachbuilders.  Most cars left the factory as tourers.  

Looking to move into automobile manufacturing, BMW bought the Automobilwerk Eisenach in 1928 and, with it, the rights to build the Dixi car. At first the cars were badged as BMW Dixi but the Dixi name was dropped in 1929 when the DA-1 was replaced by a slightly updated version, the BMW 3/15 DA-2.

 Dixi DA 1 4 cyl, 1927–1929

Dixi
First car made by manufacturer
Austin Motor Company